Newfane High School is a New York State public high school located in Newfane, New York, United States.  The senior high school's mascot is the panther.

References

3)^ http://newfane.wnyric.org/domain/5
3)^ http://newfane.wnyric.org/domain/34

Public high schools in New York (state)
Schools in Niagara County, New York